The 1993 election for Mayor of Los Angeles took place on April 20, 1993, with a run-off election on June 8, 1993. This was the first race in 64 years that an incumbent was not on the ballot. It marked the first time in 24 years that retiring Mayor Tom Bradley was not on the ballot, after five consecutive victories starting in 1973. Richard Riordan became the first Republican mayor elected in 36 years.

Municipal elections in California, including Mayor of Los Angeles, are officially nonpartisan; candidates' party affiliations do not appear on the ballot.

Election 
After the retirement of Tom Bradley, the seat was open for the first time since the 1929 election when incumbent George E. Cryer retired. Many city council members ran for the post, including Michael Woo, Joel Wachs, Nate Holden, and Ernani Bernardi. Other local area polticians, including Assemblyman Richard Katz, Deputy Mayor Linda Greigo, and Board of Recreation and Parks Commissioner Richard Riordan. 

Riordan used $4.2 million during the campaign, with much of the donations to him from the more conservative San Fernando Valley, Westside, and Harbor area. In the primary election, Riordan and Woo advanced to the runoff.

Riordan and Woo criticized each other over their ability to fight crime and about the economy, with Riordan calling Woo a career politician and Woo saying that Riordan was a "symbol of 1980s greed." In the runoff election, Riordan defeated Woo, with the Jewish population in Los Angeles seen by some as the defining factor for Riordan's win. Some newspapers also said that Riordan's hiring of gay staffers helped bolster the vote from gay and lesbians in the city as well.

Results

Primary election

General election

References and footnotes

External links
 Office of the City Clerk, City of Los Angeles

1993 California elections
1993
Los Angeles
Mayoral Election
April 1993 events in the United States
June 1993 events in the United States